Laura Chantal Dijkema  (born 18 February 1990) is a Dutch volleyball player, who plays as a setter. She is a member of the Women's National Team. She played for Leningradka Saint-Petersburg.

Career
Dijkema began playing volleyball in 1997 at the age of 7, at the club Smash in her hometown of Beilen. In 2006 as a 16-year-old she went to play at DOK from Dwingeloo, then in the highest league in the Netherlands. In 2010, Dijkema, then at Halkbank from Turkey, got her first chance at  the Dutch national team at the Montreux Volley Masters. From 2011 to 2016 Dijkema played for several clubs in Germany. For the season 2016-17 she has signed a contract with Novarra from Italy.

Awards

Clubs

National championships
2008/2009  Dutch Cup, with Martinus Amstelveen
2008/2009  Dutch Championship, with Martinus Amstelveen
2009/2010  Dutch SuperCup 2009, with TVC Amstelveen
2009/2010  Dutch Cup, with Martinus Amstelveen
2009/2010  Dutch Championship, with TVC Amstelveen
2010/2011  Dutch SuperCup 2010, with TVC Amstelveen
2010/2011  Dutch Championship, with TVC Amstelveen
2014/2015  German Championship, with Dresdner SC
2015/2016  German Cup, with Dresdner SC
2015/2016  German Championship, with Dresdner SC
2016/2017  Italian Championship, with Igor Gorgonzola Novara 
2020/2021  Russian Championship (with )

National team

Senior team
2015  Montreux Volley Masters
2015  CEV European Championship
2016  FIVB World Grand Prix

Individuals
2017 European Championship "Best Setter"

References

External links
FIVB profile

1990 births
Living people
Dutch women's volleyball players
Dutch expatriate sportspeople in Germany
Dutch expatriate sportspeople in Italy
Dutch expatriate sportspeople in Turkey
European Games competitors for the Netherlands
Expatriate volleyball players in Germany
Expatriate volleyball players in Italy
Expatriate volleyball players in Turkey
People from Midden-Drenthe
Volleyball players at the 2015 European Games
Volleyball players at the 2016 Summer Olympics
Setters (volleyball)
Halkbank volleyball players
Olympic volleyball players of the Netherlands
Sportspeople from Drenthe
21st-century Dutch women